Tove Skutnabb-Kangas (born on July 6, 1940 in Helsinki, Finland) is a Finnish linguist and educator. She is known for coining the term linguicism to refer to discrimination based on language.

Life 
After receiving school education in Helsinki she worked for a short time at the teacher training college. In 1967 and 1968 she was in the United States, where she worked at the Department of Nordic Languages at Harvard. After that she worked briefly as a teacher in Helsinki. Since 1970 she has worked as a scientist at universities in Finland and Denmark. In 1976 she obtained her first doctorate in Helsinki; The subject of her doctorate is bilingualism. From 1995 to 2000 she taught at Roskilde University, where she was a guest researcher from 1979 to 2007. Since then she has been emeritus.

The topic of her work is primarily the study of the conditions of bilingualism. At the beginning of the 1980s she developed the concept of linguicism, with which she summarizes the discrimination of minority languages. She criticizes the neglect of children who speak mother tongues that are foreign to the country where they live (for example Turkish children in Germany) as well as the devaluation of bilingualism. Kangas defined linguicism as the "ideologies and structures which are used to legitimate, effectuate, and reproduce unequal division of power and resources (both material and non-material) between groups which are defined on the basis of language".

In 2000 a book was published with the title "Rights to language: equity, power and education; celebrating the 60th birthday of Tove Skutnabb-Kangas" by Robert Phillipson.

In 2003, she and Aina Moll won the Linguapax Prize, awarded by Linguapax International.

Works 

 
 
 
  (478 pages, Paperback).

Bibliography

References

External links 
 
 Tove Skutnabb-Kangas's homepage

1940 births
Finnish educators
Living people
Pages with unreviewed translations
Linguists from Finland
Women linguists
Finnish expatriates in Denmark
Finnish expatriates in the United States